The W.A.R. Hawker Sea Fury is a half-scale homebuilt replica of a Hawker Sea Fury carrier fighter produced by War Aircraft Replicas International for amateur construction.

The first example was built in England, and flew in 1986.

Specifications (W.A.R. Hawker Sea Fury)

Notes

References

W.A.R. Sea Fury

External links

 War Aircraft Replicas International Inc 
 W.A.R. Aircraft Replicas International

Homebuilt aircraft
Hawker
Single-engined tractor aircraft
Low-wing aircraft
1980s United States sport aircraft
Replica aircraft
Aircraft first flown in 1986